is a remake to Saiyuki Reload Gunlock and the fifth season of the Saiyuki anime television series adapted from the manga of Saiyuki Reload by Kazuya Minekura and produced by Liden Films.

Saiyuki Reload: Zeroin, will cover the manga's "Even a Worm" arc. When the monstrous Gyumaoh was defeated by the war god Nataku Taishi and imprisoned in Houtou Castle, an era of peace began in the land of Togenkyo. Now, hundreds of years later, those seeking to resurrect Gyumaoh have unleashed a plague upon the world. The wave of negative power generated by his attempted resurrection has driven youkai to the brink of insanity. To save humanity from violent slaughter, Kanzeon Bosatsu sends Son Goku, Genjo Sanzo, Sha Gojyo, and Cho Hakkai to the west in order to prevent Gyumaoh from rising once again.

It is directed by Misato Takada, with Michiko Yokote and Aya Matsui writing the series' scripts, Noriko Ogura designing the characters and serving as chief animation director, and Yūsuke Shirato composing the music. The main cast members reprised their roles. It aired from January 6 to March 31, 2022, on AT-X, Tokyo MX1, BS11 consist of 13 episodes. 

Sentai Filmworks licensed the series outside of Asia with HIDIVE streaming the series. In South and Southeast Asia, Muse Communication licensed the anime.  

The series was released in two Blu-ray box volumes. Volume 1 was released on April 27, 2022 and volume 2 was released on June 29, 2022.

On December 15, 2022, Sentai Filmworks licensed the anime in Northern America and SECTION23 will be the home video distributor which releases on March 7, 2023.

Granrodeo performed the opening theme "Kamino Hotokemo," while Shugo Nakamura performed the ending theme "Ruten." 



Episode list

References

External links 
 Saiyuki Reload: Zeroin Official website 

Saiyuki (manga)
Saiyuki